Tephritis rasa is a species of tephritid or fruit flies in the genus Tephritis of the family Tephritidae.

Distribution
France.

References

Tephritinae
Insects described in 1934
Diptera of Europe